Andrey Sheptytsky, OSBM (29 July 1865 – 1 November 1944) served as the  Metropolitan Archbishop of the Ukrainian Greek Catholic Church from 1901 until his death in 1944. His tenure in office spanned two world wars and seven political regimes: Austrian,  Russian,  Ukrainian, Polish,  Soviet, General Government (Nazi), and again Soviet.

According to the church historian Jaroslav Pelikan, "Arguably, Metropolitan Andriy Sheptytsky was the most influential figure ...in the entire history of the Ukrainian Church in the twentieth century". The Lviv National Museum, founded by Sheptytsky in 1905, now bears his name.

The Information-Resource Center of the Ukrainian Catholic University that was opened in September 2017 also bears his name  The Metropolitan Andrey Sheptytsky Center.

Life
He was born as Count Roman Aleksander Maria Szeptycki in a village 40 km west/northwest of Lviv called Prylbychi, in the Kingdom of Galicia and Lodomeria, then a crownland of the Austrian Empire.

The Sheptytsky family descends from the Ruthenian nobility, but in the 18th century had become Polish-speaking and Roman Catholic. The maternal Fredro family descends from the Polish nobility. Among his ancestors, there were many important church figures, including two metropolitans of Kyiv, Atanasy and Lev. His maternal grandfather was the Polish writer Aleksander Fredro. One of his brothers, Klymentiy Sheptytsky, M.S.U., became a Studite monk, and another, Stanisław Szeptycki, became a General in the Polish Army. He was 2 m 10 cm (6 ft. 10 in.) tall.

Sheptytsky received his education first at home and then in Kraków. After graduating he went to serve in the Austro-Hungarian Army but after a few months he fell sick and was forced to abandon it. Instead, he studied law in Kraków and Breslau, receiving his doctorate in 1888. During his studies he visited Italy, where he was granted an audience with Pope Leo XIII at the Vatican, and to the Ukrainian heartland of Kyiv, then under Russian rule, where he met some of the most prominent Ukrainian personalities of that time. He also visited Moscow.

According to his biographer Fr. Cyril Korolevsky, Sheptytsky's lifelong obsession with creating the Russian Greek Catholic Church as a means of reuniting the Russian people with the Holy See goes back at least to his first trip to Russia in 1887. Afterwards, Sheptytsky "wrote some reflections" between October and November of 1887, and expressed his belief, "that the Great Schism, which became definitive in Russia in the fifteenth century, was a bad tree, and it was useless to keep cutting the branches without uprooting the trunk itself, because the branches would always grow back."

Religious life
Despite his father's opposition, Sheptytsky became a monk at the Basilian monastery in Dobromyl,(1888) returning to his roots to serve what was regarded as the peasant Ukrainian Greek Catholic Church. He took the name, Andrew, after the younger brother of Saint Peter, Andrew the Apostle, considered the founder of the Byzantine Church and also specifically of the Ukrainian Church. He then studied at the Jesuit Seminary in Kraków, receiving a doctoral degree in theology in 1894. In 1892 he was ordained a priest in Przemyśl. He was made rector of the Monastery of St Onuphrius in Lviv in 1896.

In 1899, following the death of Cardinal Sylvester Sembratovych, Sheptytsky was nominated by Emperor Franz Joseph to fill the vacant position of Ukrainian Greek Catholic Bishop of Stanyslaviv (now Ivano-Frankivsk), and Pope Leo XIII concurred. Thus he was consecrated as bishop in Lviv on 17 September 1899 by Metropolitan Julian Sas-Kuilovsky assisted by Bishop Chekhovych and Bishop Weber, the Latin-Rite auxiliary of Lviv. A year later, on 12 December 1900 and following the death of Sembratovych's successor, Sheptytsky was appointed, at the age of thirty-six, Metropolitan Archbishop of Lviv and enthroned on 17 January 1901.

Sheptytsky visited North America in 1910 where he met with Ukrainian Greek Catholic immigrant communities in the United States; attended the twenty-first International Eucharistic Congress in Montreal; toured Ukrainian communities in Canada; and invited the Redemptorist fathers ministering in the Byzantine rite to come to Ukraine.

After the outbreak of World War I, Sheptytsky was arrested by the Imperial Russian government and imprisoned in monastery of Saint Euthymius, Suzdal (1914-1917). He was released in 1918 and returned to Lviv from the Russian Empire. Bolsheviks destroyed his parents' rural house in Prylbychi where he was born. During the destruction the family archives were lost. 

As a student, Sheptytsky learned Hebrew in order to better relate to the Jewish community. During pastoral visits to Jewish villages, he was sometimes met with the Torah. During World War II he harbored hundreds of Jews in his residence and in Greek Catholic monasteries. He also issued the pastoral letter, "Thou Shalt Not Kill", to protest Nazi atrocities. Alone among the church leaders in Nazi-occupied Europe, Sheptytsky openly spoke in defense of the persecuted Jews. He sent an official letter, as the First Bishop of the Ukrainian Catholic Church, to Hitler and Himmler protesting about the destruction of the Jews. In a special Pastoral Letter addressed to his Ukrainian faithful, he strongly forbade them (under the pain of excommunication) from participating or helping in the destruction of Jews. In addition, he issued secret instructions to his secular and monastic clergy, ordering them to help the Jews by hiding them on church property, feeding them and smuggling them out of the country. One of the rabbis whose life was saved by Metropolitan Sheptytsky, David Kahane, stated: "Andrew Sheptytsky deserves the undying gratitude of the Jews and the honorific title 'Prince of the Righteous'". During this period he secretly consecrated Josyf Slipyj as his successor.

Sheptytsky in the early years of his episcopacy expressed strong support for a celibate Eastern Catholic clergy. Yet he said to have changed his mind after years in Imperial Russian prisons where he encountered the faithfulness of married Russian and Ukrainian Orthodox priests and their wives and families. After this, he fought Latin Catholic leaders who attempted to require clerical celibacy among Eastern Catholic priests.

Sheptytsky was also a patron of artists, students, including many Orthodox Christians, and a pioneer of ecumenismhe also opposed the Second Polish Republic policy of forced conversion of Polish Ukrainians into Latin Rite Catholics. He strove for reconciliation between ethnic groups and wrote frequently on social issues and spirituality. He also founded the Studite and Ukrainian Redemptorist orders, a hospital, the National Museum, and the Theological Academy. He actively supported various Ukrainian organizations such as the Prosvita and in particular, the Plast Ukrainian Scouting Organization, and donated a campsite in the Carpathian Mountains called Sokil and became the patron saint of the Plast fraternity Orden Khrestonostsiv.

Sheptytsky died in 1944 and is buried in St. George's Cathedral in Lviv. In 1958 the cause for his canonization was begun, but stalled at the behest of Cardinal Stefan Wyszynski. Pope Francis approved his life as being one of heroic virtue on 16 July 2015, thus proclaiming him to be Venerable.

Jews who were saved thanks to actions of Andrey Sheptytsky have lobbied Yad Vashem for years to have him named Righteous Among the Nations, just as his brother Klymentiy Sheptytsky had been, but so far Yad Vashem has not done so, mostly due to concerns with his initial belief that German invaders would be better for Ukraine than the Soviet Union had been. He initially supported the 14th Waffen Grenadier Division of the SS (1st Galician), blessing new recruits into the division. According to his close friend Rabbi David Kahane, however, Sheptytsky had believed that the Division would be used to fight Stalinism and personally expressed disgust in a conversation with the Rabbi about the Division's subsequent role as perpetrators of the Holocaust in Ukraine.

Memory 
The first monument to Metropolitan Andrei Sheptytsky was erected during his lifetime in 1932. It was destroyed by the Soviets in 1939.

A new monument to Metropolitan Andrei Sheptytsky was inaugurated in Lviv on 29 July 2015, the 150th anniversary of his birth.

Images

Notes

Further reading
 , Metropolitan Andrew (1865–1944), Translated and Revised by Serge Keleher, Stauropegion, 1993, Lviv.
 Aharon Weiss, Andrei Sheptytsky in Encyclopedia of the Holocaust vol. 4, pp. 1347–8
 The Ukrainian Division Halychyna by Dr. Roman Serbyn

Films

External links
 
  Andrei Sheptytsky at the Encyclopedia of Ukraine
 Metropolitan Andrey Sheptytsky Institute of Eastern Christian Studies
 Metropolitan Andrei Sheptytskyi who was called the "apostle of Ukrainian truth", Welcome to Ukraine
Thou Shalt Not Kill (Ukrainian, pdf of scanned images)
Thou Shalt Not Kill (English, pdf)
He Welcomed the Nazis and Saved Jews
Metropolitan Sheptytsky, Apostle of Church Unity
Sheptytsky Award Tablet, Vladislav Davidzon

1865 births
1944 deaths
Catholic resistance to Nazi Germany
Andrey
People from Lviv Oblast
People from the Kingdom of Galicia and Lodomeria
Austro-Hungarian Eastern Catholic priests
Ukrainian Austro-Hungarians
Polish Austro-Hungarians
Ukrainian nobility
19th-century Polish nobility
Ukrainian philanthropists
Ukrainian anti-communists
19th-century Eastern Catholic archbishops
20th-century Eastern Catholic archbishops
20th-century venerated Christians
Venerated Catholics by Pope Francis
Venerated Eastern Catholics
Order of Saint Basil the Great
Burials at St. George's Cathedral, Lviv
Ukrainian prisoners and detainees
People who rescued Jews during the Holocaust
Prisoners and detainees of Russia
Founders of Eastern Catholic religious communities
Eastern Catholic writers
20th-century Polish nobility
Metropolitans of Galicia (1808-2005)